Chioma Okoye is a Nigerian actress, writer and producer from Aguleri-Otu in Anambra East local government area of Anambra State, Nigeria. Since her Nollywood film debut in 2002, she has appeared in over 100 films. She is the CEO of Purple Ribbon Entertainment.

Early life and education 
Okoye was born in Kaduna she grew up with her family, parents and brothers and sisters Godwin, Sam, Gloria, Christian, and Victoria Okoye. Her mother Okoye Noami. O and father Joseph Okoye died 30 April 2013. Okoye attended Faith Nursery and Primary school, Kaduna state and Christ the King Seminary, Nnobi Anambra State. She went to University of Lagos Unilag where she studied history and strategic.

Career
Okoye was introduced to acting by Pete Edochie who happens to be her uncle, it all happened when she joined her uncle at a location. She first played a role on No Shaking which she played along with Victor Osuagwu, Sam Loco Efe, and Nothing Spoil with Chinedu Ikedieze, Osita Iheme, and Uche Ogbuagu. She hit the market with her first movie she produced which is Aso-Ebi Girls. Okoye became more well known after Abuja Connection released in 2003.

Filmography

Awards

References

External links

21st-century Nigerian women singers
1983 births
Living people
People from Kaduna
21st-century Nigerian actresses
University of Lagos alumni
Nigerian film producers
Nigerian film directors
Nigerian film actresses
Actresses from Anambra State
Igbo actresses